Two male athletes from Chile competed at the 1996 Summer Paralympics in Atlanta, United States.

See also
Chile at the Paralympics
Chile at the 1996 Summer Olympics

References 

Nations at the 1996 Summer Paralympics
1996
Summer Paralympics
Disability in Chile